Lieutenant Colonel Robert K. Brown (born November 2, 1932) is an American combat correspondent, investigative journalist, and founder and former editor/publisher of Soldier of Fortune magazine (SOF), a mercenary magazine which reports on various armed confrontations around the world, as well as on new weapons and other military technology. Brown was also president of Omega Group Ltd, which was the parent group of SOF.

Personal
Born in Monroe, Michigan, he graduated from Colorado University. On September 22, 1999, Las Vegas, Nevada Mayor Oscar Goodman issued a proclamation declaring that day to be "Soldier of Fortune Day" and "Lt. Col. Robert K. Brown Day" in honor of Soldier of Fortune magazine, its 20th annual convention in Las Vegas, and its founder and publisher."

Career
Brown served in the US Army from 1954-1957 and again from 1964–1985. He was a Green Beret, served with Special Forces in Vietnam, and retired from the US Army as a Lieutenant Colonel.  At one point, Brown was the Vice Chairman of the NRA.

In 1970, he founded a book publishing firm with Peder Lund named Paladin Press. Brown began publishing Soldier of Fortune in 1975 in Boulder, Colorado. In April 2022, Brown announced he had sold Soldier of Fortune to journalist Susan Katz Keating, a frequent contributor to the magazine.

A Chicago Tribune reporter doing a story on Brown's involvement in the civil war in El Salvador in March 1984 witnessed Brown become the victim of an accidental shooting when one of Brown's friends pulled the trigger of a gun he thought was unloaded. The friend shot himself through the hand and the bullet struck Brown in the calf. "You stupid son a bitch, you shot me," Brown said. "And now I can't go to El Salvador." On the other hand, editors of Soldier of Fortune instructed Salvadorans in subjects ranging from weapons marksmanship to basic military skills such as water purification. They told The Washington Post, in an article of 1983, they accompanied Salvadorans on at least three combat patrols as observers, armed solely with handguns for self-defense and without firing. Alexander McColl, one of the editors that took part in April and August, claimed that expenses were covered by the magazine. These Soldier of Fortune members briefed military personnel of the US embassy on how well Salvadoran soldiers fought in the field.

In 2011, Brown supported Steve Schreiner's campaign for the National Rifle Association Board of Directors. Schreiner was not endorsed by the NRA's Nominating Committee.

Publications

Books
 I Am Soldier of Fortune: Dancing with Devils. Havertown, Penn.: Casemate (2013). .
 Merc: American Soldiers of Fortune, with Jay Mallin. Havertown, Penn.: Casemate (2018). .

Articles
 "The Plot Against Papa Doc." National Review (Jan. 24, 1967).
 "The Bayo-Pawley Affair," with Miguel Acosta. Soldier of Fortune (Feb. 1976).
 "George W. Bacon, III: A 20th Century Crusader," with Robert Himber. Soldier of Fortune, vol. 1, no. 4 (Fall 1976), pp. 13–19, 76-77.
 "Rhodesia is Ready: It's Elite Forces are on Red Alert." Soldier of Fortune, vol. 1, no. 3 (Summer 1976), pp. 30–33. Full issue.
 "David Bufkin: American Merc Destroys Cuban Espionage Ring." Soldier of Fortune, vol. 2, no. 3 (Sep. 1977), pp. 25-27.

Book contributions
Editor's Notes in Guerrilla Warfare, by Yank Levy. Introduction by Franklin Mark Osanka. Boulder: Paladin Press (1964). pp. 12-14. .

See also
Soldier of Fortune magazine
Soldier of Fortune (video game)

References

1932 births
Living people
American magazine founders
American magazine publishers (people)
American magazine editors
United States Army colonels
United States Army personnel of the Vietnam War
20th-century American journalists
American male journalists
Members of the United States Army Special Forces